Tumkur University was established  in 2004 in Tumkuru, Karnataka, India. It was carved out of Bangalore University to accommodate the needs of the students from Tumkuru district. Established under the Karnataka State Universities Act, 2000, as a multi-faculty university, it has 12 postgraduate departments, 2 constituent colleges and 94 affiliated colleges. It established 29 research centres to promote advanced multi-disciplinary research and academic collaborations. In 2012, the university was recognized under section 12(b) of the UGC Act, 1956. In the same year, the National Assessment and Accreditation Council (NAAC), an inter-university council of the UGC, accredited the university with "B" Grade in the three-grade rating scale.

Faculties

The academic structure is divided into four faculties.
 Faculty of Commerce
 Dean:--Dr.G.Sudarshana Reddy
Department of Studies and Research in Commerce
 Faculty of Arts
 Dean:--Dr. D.V.ParamaShivamurthy
Department of Studies and Research in Social Work.
 Department of Studies and Research in Sociology.
 Department of Studies and Research in Economics
 Department of Studies and Research in Political Science
 Department of Studies and Research in History
 Department of Studies and Research in Mass Communication and Journalism

Faculty of Science and Technology
 Dean:--Dr.Keshava

Department of Studies and Research in Mathematics
 Department of Studies and Research in Physics
 Department of Studies and Research in Chemistry
  

 Department of Studies and Research in Botany
 Department of Studies and Research in Zoology
 Department of Studies and Research in Environmental.

 Department Studies and Research in Library and Information Science

University College of Science

The University College of Science (erstwhile Government Science College) was established in 1940. Beginning as an intermediate college, it was upgraded to a full-fledged first grade college with Bachelors courses in disciplines in the Natural Sciences. Disciplines in the Commerce subjects were introduced in 1970.

The erstwhile Government Science College was inaugurated by His Excellency Sri V.V. Giri, Bar-At-Law, the Governor of Mysore on 11 August 1966. In 1973 it was bifurcated into Science and Arts colleges.

In the year 2000–2001, new subjects like Computer Science, Microbiology, Electronics and Biochemistry were introduced. In 2007–2008, Biotechnology was introduced. In 2008, post graduate courses were introduced in Physics, Chemistry and Environment Science. In 2000, student strength of the college was 1,040; in 2005 it was 1,300; and in year 2007–2008, it was 1,323.

The college has an area of 90 acres and the infrastructure is about 98,800 sq. ft. In 2009, the Government Science College was handed over to Tumkur University, when it was renamed as University College of Science. Presently, it is one of the two constituent colleges of Tumkur University.

University College of Arts and commerce 

The Government Science College was bifurcated in 1974 into Government Arts College and Government Science College. In 2009, Tumkur University recognised the college as a constituent college of the university and renamed it University College of Arts.

Over the years, the institution has been offering courses in Arts & Commerce. At present, the college has 42 teaching, and 20 non-teaching staff. Nearly 3000 students are pursuing their education in the Arts and Commerce streams. Situated in a sprawling 25-acre plot, the college houses 25 spacious lecture halls, a library with more than 50,000 titles and 55,000 volumes of books on different disciplines, along with journals, magazines, newspapers and a reading and reference section. The college also has indoor and outdoor stadia administered by the Youth Services and Sports Department of the Government of Karnataka.  It also has a unit of the National Cadet Corps and the National Service Scheme.

Journals published by the university

International Journal of Science Research

International Journal of Science Research (IJSR) reports on publication of original research contributions in fundamental and applied areas of science. IJSR is a quarterly flagship journal of Tumkur University.

International Journal of Social Sciences and Humanities

International Journal of Social Sciences and Humanities is a scholarly professional biannual journal published by Tumkur University. Its purpose is to provide a forum to share knowledge related to broad range of topics including political science, sociology, history, archaeology, social work, geography, international studies, women's studies, children's learning and health, economics, business ethics, cities, intellectual property rights, language acquisition, privacy, the aging population, quality of life, technology in aboriginal communities, information communication technology, library and information science, physical education and sports sciences, dispute resolution, environment, sustainable development and subjects related to commerce and management.

Lokajnana

Lokajnana is a quarterly journal of research, published in Kannada. It contains original and translated research papers.

Recognised research centres
The university has recognised 56 independent academic institutions from all over India as research centres for doctoral and advanced study in various areas of academic research. Notable examples include:

 Institute for Social and Economic Change
 R.V. College of Engineering
 National Institute of Advanced Studies
 Maha Bodhi Society
 Sri Siddhartha Institute of Management Studies 
 Malleswaram Ladies Association 
 Madras Music Academy
 St. Aloysius College

Honorary distinguished professors
Eminent personalities appointed Honorary Distinguished Professors of the university include:

 Prof. Richard R. Ernst, Nobel Laureate in Chemistry (1991), Swiss Federal Institute of Technology (ETH) Zurich, Zurich, Switzerland
 Prof. Anthony Cheetham, FRS, Goldsmiths’ Professor of Materials Science, University of Cambridge, UK
 Prof. Kurt Wüthrich, Nobel Laureate in Chemistry (2002), Cecil H. and Ida M. Green Professor of Structural Biology, Scripps Research Institute, La Jolla, California, USA and Professor of Biophysics, ETH Zürich, Zürich, Switzerland
 Dr. Sudha Murthy, chairperson, Infosys Foundation, Bangalore
 Prof. Rudolph Marcus, Nobel Laureate in Chemistry (1992), Arthur Amos Noyes Professor of Chemistry, Division of Chemistry and Chemical Engineering, California Institute of Technology, USA
 The 14th Dalai Lama
 Prof. Eric S. Maskin, Nobel Laureate in Economics (2007), Adams University Professor, Harvard University, Cambridge, Massachusetts, USA

Chronological List of Vice Chancellors of Tumkur University

References

External links

Tumkur University Results

Universities in Karnataka
Educational institutions established in 2004
Education in Tumkur
2004 establishments in Karnataka
Universities and colleges in Tumkur district